Saint-Jean-de-Rives (Languedocien: Sant Joan de Ribas) is a commune in the Tarn department in southern France.

See also
Communes of the Tarn department

References

Communes of Tarn (department)